Hysterocarpus traskii pomo is one of two subspecies of tule perch and is endemic to the Central Valley drainages of California, USA. The subspecies name refers to the Pomo tribe of native Americans who occupied the region.

References
 Peter B. Moyle, Inland Fishes of California (University of California Press, 2002), pp. 424–428

Embiotocidae